Elizabeth Lynn Zechiedrich is a professor in the department of Molecular Virology and Microbiology at Baylor College of Medicine. Her laboratory's research considers the structure-function properties of DNA and DNA topoisomerases. She was elected to the National Academy of Inventors in 2017.

Zechiedrich is the technical Founder of Twister Biotech, a Baylor College of Medicine spinout company.

Early life and education 
Zechiedrich was born in Houston, Texas, and grew up in Arkansas. She attended Van Buren Junior High School and Northside High School. Zechiedrich studied zoology, music, and mathematics at the University of Arkansas. She moved to Vanderbilt University School of Medicine for graduate studies, where she started to study toposiomerases.

Research and career 
In 1997, Zechiedrich was appointed to the faculty at the Baylor College of Medicine. Her research considers the structure-function properties of DNA and DNA topoisomerases. DNA topisomerases are enzymes that modulate DNA structure and function (for example replication, recombination and chromosome segregation), and they are often targets of anti-cancer drugs. Zechiedrich has developed novel mathematical and experimental approaches to characterize the topography of DNA.

Zechiedrich's laboratory has focused on better understanding fluoroquinolones, broad-spectrum antibiotics that target type-2 topoisomerases. These quinolone antibiotics stabilize topoisomerase-DNA cleavage intermediates. She is interested in how Escherichia coli interact with fluoroquinolones. The breaking and resealing of topoisomerases modulates the formation of DNA supercoils and knots, which are overproduced by certain anticancer and antibiotic drugs and can cause cell death. She showed that this coiling and knotting transmits stress along the DNA backbone, which promotes the separation of helical strains and exposes DNA bases. Zechiedrich's collaborators made use of electron cryotomography to better understand the three-dimensional structures of DNA.

Zechiedrich’s laboratory conceived small circular DNA nanoparticles ("minimized vectors") that can be used to study supercoiling and the function of therapeutic topoisomerase inhibitors. The dynamic movement of the DNA 'minivectors' was investigated using atomic force microscopy by Alice Pyne at the University of Sheffield. Minimized vectors can be used as substrates for enzymes that act on DNA, as well as serving as gene therapy vectors. Zechiedrich has theorized that minimized vectors could assist in cancer, cardiovascular disease and respiratory disease therapies.

Selected publications

References

External links 
 

Living people
Year of birth missing (living people)
American biochemists
University of Arkansas alumni
Vanderbilt University alumni
Baylor College of Medicine faculty
American classical flautists
Women flautists
People from Houston
20th-century American scientists
21st-century American scientists
American women scientists